Marinobacter halophilus is a Gram-negative, non-spore-forming and halophilic bacterium from the genus of Marinobacter which has been isolated from the Xiaochaidan Lake in the Qaidam Basin in China.

References

Further reading 
 

Alteromonadales
Bacteria described in 2015